Narrows Creek is a stream in Sauk County, Wisconsin, in the United States. It is a tributary of the Baraboo River.

Narrows Creek flows through narrows, hence the name.

See also
List of rivers of Wisconsin

References

Rivers of Sauk County, Wisconsin
Rivers of Wisconsin